Killare is a civil parish in County Westmeath, Ireland.

Killare is one of 9 civil parishes in the barony of Rathconrath in the Province of Leinster.

Killare civil parish comprises Ballymore village and 43 townlands: Ardbrennan, Ballinacor or Clonboy, Ballinaspick or Bishopstown, Ballinive, Ballinkeeny or Mosstown, Ballinlavan, Ballyclogher, Ballydavid, Ballymacallen, Ballymacartan, Bessville, Bishopstown or Ballinaspick, Bracknahevla, Clare, Clinickilroe, Clonboy or Ballinacor, Clonnamanagh, Clonnslynagh, Clonybane, Clonyveey, Clyglass, Duneel, Dungaghy, Gibstown, Keenoge, Killarecastle, Killarechurch, Killaroo, Killeenagh, Killeenagroagh, Killeenbane or Tullagh Upper, Killeenboy, Killeenbrack, Lurgan, Maddadoo, Moranspark, Mosstown or Ballinkeeny, Mosstown Demesne, Mullaghcloe, Pottiaghan Commons, Rackavra, Rathskeagh Lower, Rathskeagh Upper, Rowe or Toordillon, Taghnafearagh, Toorcoffey, Toordillon or Rowe and
Tullagh Upper or Killeenbane.

The neighbouring civil parishes are: Templepatrick to the north, Ballymorin to the north–east, Conry to the east, Ardnurcher, or Horseleap to the south–east, Kilcumreragh to the south–west and Ballymore to the west.

References

External links
Killare civil parish at the IreAtlas Townland Data Base
Killare civil parish at townlands.ie
Killare civil parish at The Placenames Database of Ireland

Civil parishes of County Westmeath